= Before Auschwitz =

2015 book by Kim Wunschmann

- first edition cover
- Author: Kim Wunschmann
- Publisher: Harvard University Press
- Publication date: 2015

Before Auschwitz: Jewish Prisoners in the Prewar Concentration Camps is a book by Kim Wünschmann, published by Harvard University Press in 2015, which deals with Jewish prisoners in Nazi concentration camps before the Holocaust.
